Betz is a commune in the Oise department in northern France. The Moroccan King Mohammed VI owns a 71ha palace there, where he is said to employ much of the commune's population.

Population

See also
 Communes of the Oise department

References

Communes of Oise